Christmas is the fourth studio album by Old Man Gloom, released in August 2004 by Tortuga Recordings. Aaron Turner, owner of Hydra Head Records and former Isis guitarist and vocalist, described this album in September 2010 as “one of the most engaging projects I have been involved with both musically and visually.”

Critical reception
CMJ New Music Report wrote that the "carols ... alternate between propulsive, pummeling epic shit-kickers (opener 'Gift') and experimental noise tracks ('Accord-O-Matic')."

Track listing 
 "Gift" – 5:47
 "Skullstorm" – 0:51
 "Something for the Mrs." – 5:44
 "Sleeping With Snakes" – 2:33
 "Lukeness Monster" – 2:54
 "'Tis Better to Receive" – 1:25
 "Accord-O-Matic" – 7:50
 "The Volcano" – 7:32
 "Close Your Eyes, Roll Back into Your Head" – 3:30
 "Girth and Greed" – 1:33
 "Sonic Dust" – 3:06
 "Valhalla" – 2:08
 "Christmas Eve parts I, II & III (alt. version)" – 16:17

Personnel 
 Nate Newton – guitar, vocals
 Santos "Hanno" Montano –  drums, long hair, backup vocals
 Kurt Ballou – producer, drums on "Gift"
 Eugene Robinson – vocals
 Luke Scarola – electronics
 Caleb Scofield – bass, vocals
 Aaron Turner – guitar, vocals
 Nick Zampiello – mastering

References

External links 
 Turner presents the growth of the album artwork
 Turner presents the growth of the album artwork (continued)

Old Man Gloom albums
2004 albums
Rock Christmas albums
Heavy metal Christmas albums